Bartley Green F.C. was an English football club originally based in Bartley Green, a residential suburban area of Birmingham, in the West Midlands.  They folded near the end of the 2013–14 season with immediate effect.

History

Bartley Green F.C. was founded in the 1950s as a Saturday football team; however, since the 1970s most of the club's football had been played in Sunday League and cup competitions. In the 2005–06 season, they joined the Midland Combination Division Two and were the league champions. Since the 2005–06 season the club has entered a parallel Saturday league side in addition to its usual team. After two seasons in the Midland Combination League, winning Division Two in 2005–06, and then taking the Division One title 2006–07 in successive seasons, the club were promoted into the Midland Combination Premier League.

Floodlights were erected in 2008–09, which led to the club passing the Midland Combination standards required regarding their ground and facilities.

The club also encountered their first trophy, in the 2010–11 season they beat Fairfield Villa 2–0 to lift the Smedley Crooke Cup. Then again two seasons later, in the 2012–13 season, Bartley Green lifted the Smedley Cup again. This time an eight-goal thriller with Bartley Green winning 5–3 against Phoenix United.

The club transferred to the West Midlands (Regional) League Premier Division after the 2011–12 season. In February 2014 an off the field incident, in which a club stewardess was awarded £18,832 in compensation following unfair dismissal which contributed to the clubs imminent decline following financial worries. The club resigned from the league midway through the 2013–14 season.

League

Honours
Midland Combination Division One
Champions 2006–07
Midland Combination Division Two
Champions 2005–06
Birmingham Midweek Floodlit Cup
Champions 2009–10
Runners-up 2007–08
Smedley Crooke Cup
Champions 2010–11, 2012–13

Records
FA Cup
First Qualifying Round 2010–11
FA Vase
First Round 2008–09, 2009–10, 2011–12

References

Defunct football clubs in England
Defunct football clubs in the West Midlands (county)
Football clubs in Birmingham, West Midlands
Sport in Dudley
West Midlands (Regional) League
1949 establishments in England
Association football clubs established in 1949
Association football clubs disestablished in 2014